Fusedmarc is a Lithuanian electronic band from Vilnius. The band consists of lead vocalist Viktorija Ivanovskaja, multi-instrumentalist Denis Zujev, and visual designer Stasys Žak. They represented Lithuania in the Eurovision Song Contest 2017, with the song "Rain of Revolution" but failed to qualify to the final. They were placed 17th: second to last in the second semifinal, giving Lithuania its second-worst result in the competition.

Members
 Viktorija Ivanovskaja (CIILIIA) – lead vocals, melodist, composer, programming
 Denisas Zujevas (DJ VAKX) – guitar, bass, drums, composer, programming, songwriting

Discography

EPs

Singles

References

Lithuanian musical groups
Eurovision Song Contest entrants for Lithuania
Eurovision Song Contest entrants of 2017
Lithuanian electronic music groups
Musical groups established in 2004
2004 establishments in Lithuania